KWWR (95.7 FM), branded as Mix Country 96, is a radio station broadcasting a country music format. It is licensed to Mexico, Missouri, United States, and serves the Columbia, Missouri area and reaches most of the northeast Missouri region. The station is owned by Kxeo Radio.

References

External links
 

Country radio stations in the United States
WWR